The 2017 FIVB Beach Volleyball World Tour was the global elite professional beach volleyball circuit organized by the Fédération Internationale de Volleyball (FIVB) for the 2017 beach volleyball season. The 2017 FIVB Beach Volleyball World Tour Calendar comprised three FIVB World Tour 5-star tournaments, two 4-star, four 3-star, four 2-star and six 1-star events, the World Championships and the World Tour Finals, all organised by the FIVB.

The 2017 edition of the Swatch Beach Volleyball FIVB World Tour Finals will be held in Hamburg, Germany from August 22 to 27.

Schedule
Key

Men

Women

Medal table by country

References

External links
2017 FIVB Beach Volleyball World Tour at FIVB.org
Swatch Major Series official website

 

World Tour
2017